Iroquois High School is a high school located in southwestern Louisville, Kentucky, United States near Iroquois Park, in the Beechmont neighborhood (nestled between two portions of the Iroquois neighborhood). It is part of the Jefferson County Public Schools. As of the 2014–15 school year, there were 1,205 students at the school.

History
In August 1965, due to a demand for a new high school in the area of the Iroquois neighborhood, Gottschalk Junior High School was converted into Iroquois High.

Programs
The school provides programs for Construction Technology and U.S. Navy ROTC. In 2014, the school began to host the district's first International Academy, a satellite program for the Newcomer Academy at The Academy @ Shawnee that serves English language learners in grades 6–10.

Athletics
The school athletic complex has the gymnasium, the Iroquois Athletic Center, which seats a maximum of 2,000 people. Also, Fryrear Field is a stadium seats a maximum of 4,000 people. The school has athletic programs for baseball, basketball, cross country, football, golf, soccer, fast pitch softball, tennis, track, volleyball, wrestling and cheerleading.

Notable alumni and faculty
Notable alumni and faculty of Iroquois High School include:
 Brad H. Cox, racehorse trainer
 Scott Davenport, current head men's basketball coach at nearby Bellarmine University
 Ed Hamilton (faculty), sculptor
 Kym Hampton, WNBA player
 Herana-Daze Jones, American football player
 A'dia Mathies, WNBA player
 Bryson Tiller, singer, songwriter and rapper

See also
 Public schools in Louisville, Kentucky

References

External links
 

Jefferson County Public Schools (Kentucky)
Public high schools in Kentucky
1965 establishments in Kentucky
Educational institutions established in 1965
High schools in Louisville, Kentucky